The sieve-patterned moray eel (Gymnothorax cribroris) is a moray eel found in coral reefs in the western Pacific Ocean and northern Australia. It was first named by Whitley in 1932 and is also commonly known as the sieve moray, brown-flecked reef eel, brown-flecked moray or the Australian moray.

References

External links
 Fishes of Australia : Gymnothorax cribroris

sieve-patterned moray eel
Marine fish of Northern Australia
sieve-patterned moray eel